Daði Freyr Pétursson (born 30 June 1992), known professionally as Daði Freyr or simply Daði, is an Icelandic musician living in Berlin, Germany. As the frontman of Daði & Gagnamagnið, he was due to represent Iceland in the Eurovision Song Contest 2020 with the song "Think About Things", before the event was cancelled in response to the COVID-19 pandemic. Instead, he represented Iceland in the Eurovision Song Contest 2021 with the song "10 Years", finishing in fourth place.

Early life
Daði was born in Reykjavík but grew up in Denmark until the age of nine, then his family moved to Iceland and settled in the Southern Region, first in Laugaland and later in Ásahreppur.

Music career
In his youth, Daði practiced drums and studied piano and bass guitar. He co-founded the band RetRoBot with his friend Kristján Pálmi. Later, singer Gunnlaugur Bjarnason and guitarist Guðmundur Einar Vilbergsson, whom he had met at the South Iceland Multicultural School, joined the band. In 2012, the band RetRoBot won the Músíktilraunir ("Music Experiments") and Daði was chosen as the best electronic musician of the year. RetRoBot released one album, Blackout, a year later.

Söngvakeppnin and Eurovision

In 2017, Daði participated in Söngvakeppnin (competing to represent Iceland in the Eurovision Song Contest 2017) with the song "Is This Love?". In performances, he was supported on stage by a group consisting of his sister Sigrún Birna Pétursdóttir (backing vocalist), wife Árný Fjóla Ásmundsdóttir (dancer), and friends Hulda Kristín Kolbrúnardóttir (backing vocalist), Stefán Hannesson (dancer), and Jóhann Sigurður Jóhannsson (dancer)—known as "Gagnamagnið". Gagnamagnið, while translated to English as "the Data", literally means "the amount of data", and is the Icelandic word for "data plan". They were characterized by their signature teal green sweaters, which have pixel art portraits of themselves printed on them. He came in second place after Svala Björgvinsdóttir, who performed the song "Paper".

Daði took part in the 2020 Söngvakeppnin with the song "Think About Things" (the alternate Icelandic version also titled "Gagnamagnið"). As in Söngvakeppnin 2017, Daði performed with his group Gagnamagnið, now collectively credited as Daði & Gagnamagnið. They won the 2020 Söngvakeppnin competition and were set to represent Iceland in the Eurovision Song Contest 2020, but the event was cancelled due to the COVID-19 pandemic. Several countries that would have participated in the 2020 contest held their own alternative competitions, broadcasting the entries and crowning a winner. Daði og Gagnamagnið won six such competitions, in Austria (Der kleine Song Contest), Australia, Denmark, Finland, Norway, and Sweden. On 23 October 2020, it was announced that Daði & Gagnamagnið would remain as Icelandic representatives at the 2021 Eurovision Song Contest. They performed the song "10 Years", but a prerecorded performance from the second rehearsal was broadcast during both their semi-final and the final, due to a member of the group testing positive for COVID-19. Having qualified for the final, they finished fourth with 378 points.

Personal life
Daði is married to musician Árný Fjóla Ásmundsdóttir. Their daughter, Áróra Björg, born in 2019, was the inspiration for the lyrics of the song "Think About Things". The couple's second daughter, Kría Sif, was born in 2021.

He has his own app called "Neon Planets". His father was a bongo player for Katla Maria in Söngvakeppni 1993, though they placed 2nd last out of 10 contestants with the song "Samba".

Discography

Studio albums

EPs

Singles

As featured artist

Remixes

Notes

References

External links
 

Living people
1992 births
Dadi Freyr
Dadi Freyr
Dadi Freyr
Dadi Freyr
Eurovision Song Contest entrants of 2020
Eurovision Song Contest entrants of 2021